Love Performance is the first live album by Australian singer-songwriter Olivia Newton-John. It was recorded in 1976, during the Love Performance Tour, in Japan. The tour promoted her 1976 album, Don't Stop Believin'. The album was released only in 1981 by EMI Music Japan (formerly Toshiba EMI). The vinyl LP sold 123,590 and the cassette 10,600 copies in Japan.

No re-release has been made since the original issue, making this a coveted item among Olivia's fans. However, six tracks were released as bonus tracks on the re-release of some Newton-John studio albums, which were included in the box 40th Anniversary Collection, released by Universal Music Japan.

Background
The album artwork and booklet features pictures from Totally Hot World Tour. The booklet also lists the tracks "Take Me Home, Country Roads", "The Air That I Breathe" and "Nevertheless" as, respectively, "Country Roads", "Air That I Breathe" and "Never the Less".

It's the only released performances of "Nevertheless", "As Time Goes By" and "Love Is Alive" by Newton-John (all three songs were also performed in the 1977 TV special, Only Olivia).

Track listing

References

External links
 Love Performance at Discogs
 Love Performance at Only Olivia

Olivia Newton-John live albums
1981 live albums
Albums produced by John Farrar